Steven Laurie (born 30 October 1982 in Melbourne, Victoria, Australia) is a former Australian association football player who played as a defender. He played in England with West Ham United's youth academy and Peterborough United, before returning to Australia to play for South Melbourne FC in the National Soccer League and Sydney FC in the A-League. He is currently the head manager of Geelong SC.

Playing career
Steve Laurie started his professional youth career with the Victorian Institute of Sport, spending a year at the academy in 1997, before moving to England, joining the youth academy of West Ham United F.C. in 1998. Laurie remained with the Hammers academy until 2002, then moving to Peterborough United F.C.

He returned to Australia after being lured back by former Rangers F.C. player and then coach Stuart Munro to play for National Soccer League powerhouse South Melbourne FC in the last season of the NSL.

Laurie was one of the first six signings for the newly formed Hyundai A-League club Sydney FC, although later he was released from his contract via mutual consent, making just one appearance in his time with the blues. The inaugural coach of Sydney FC was German World Cup winner Pierre Littbarski, with whom Laurie had a falling-out. Players at Sydney FC that Laurie joined included former Manchester United legend Dwight Yorke.

After returning to Victoria, Laurie played for South Melbourne once more as well as a season at Oakleigh Cannons. Then Steve Laurie moved to Altona Magic and was promoted to captain in 2009 and led the club to championship win over highly fancied Dandenong Thunder coached by Laurie's former coach at South Melbourne and then Oakleigh Cannons Stuart Munro. 2009 was a watershed season for Laurie as the giant defender had an injury free season and was able to show all football fans why he had been on West Ham's books as a youngster.

A number of A-League Clubs have chased Laurie after the Victorian Premier league finals finished, although he opted to have a stint in Asia with Shanghai Shenhua.

Coaching career
After his stint in Asia, Laurie decided to move into coaching. He assisted long time friend Toby Paterson at National Premier Leagues Victoria 1 side St Albans Saints SC in 2014, departing late on in the season when Paterson was sacked.

Laurie was given his first senior head managing position at Victorian State League 2 North West side Geelong SC in 2015. Laurie recruited a number of quality players and helped the club recover from a poor start to finish in 6th place.

External links
Profile at UpThePosh! The Peterborough United Database
 https://web.archive.org/web/20120225081935/http://www.tribalfootball.com/nth-qld-boss-ferguson-runs-rule-over-melbourne-knights-captain-elvin-276881
 https://web.archive.org/web/20090903130501/http://www.tribalfootball.com/victorian-premier-league-favourites-crash-288021

1982 births
Living people
Soccer players from Melbourne
Australian expatriate soccer players
Australian expatriate sportspeople in England
Expatriate footballers in England
National Soccer League (Australia) players
Peterborough United F.C. players
South Melbourne FC players
West Ham United F.C. players
Victorian Institute of Sport alumni
Sydney FC players
A-League Men players
Association football defenders
Australian soccer players
Australia under-20 international soccer players
Australian soccer coaches